William Aubrey de Vere Beauclerk, 9th Duke of St Albans (24 March 1801 – 27 May 1849) was an English aristocrat and cricketer.

Early life
William Aubrey de Vere Beauclerk was born on 24 March 1801. He was the son of William Beauclerk, 8th Duke of St Albans, and his second wife, the former Maria Janetta Nelthorpe.

His paternal grandparents were Lady Catharine Ponsonby and Aubrey Beauclerk, 5th Duke of St Albans, a Whig Member of Parliament for Thetford from 1761 to 1768 and for Aldborough from 1768 to 1774. His mother was the only daughter and heiress of John Nelthorpe of Little Grimsby Hall (the former High Sheriff of Lincolnshire) and Mary Cracroft (second daughter, by his first wife, of Robert Cracroft of Hackthorn Hall).

Cricket
He played a first-class cricket match for Hampshire in 1817. He was a member of the Marylebone Cricket Club.

Personal life
On 16 June 1827, he married Harriet (née Mellon) Coutts (1777–1837), who was 23 years his elder, in London. Harriet, the widow of banker Thomas Coutts and daughter of Lt. Matthew Mellon, was an actress who eventually starred at Drury Lane. She died on 6 August 1837 and left her fortune to her step-granddaughter, who changed her surname to Angela Burdett-Coutts.

On 29 May 1839, he married, secondly, to Elizabeth Catherine Gubbins (–1893) in Harby, Leicestershire. Elizabeth was the youngest daughter of Maj.-Gen. Joseph Gubbins of Kilfrush, by his first wife Charlotte Bathoe (a daughter of James Bathoe).  They had three children:

 William Amelius Aubrey de Vere Beauclerk, 10th Duke of St Albans (1840–1898), who married Sybil Mary Grey, a daughter of Lt.-Gen. The Hon. Sir Charles Grey and granddaughter of Charles, 2nd Earl Grey. After her death in 1871, he married Grace Bernal-Osborne, a daughter of Secretary of the Admiralty Ralph Bernal Osborne and granddaughter of Ralph Bernal. 
 Lady Diana de Vere Beauclerk (1842–1905), who married Sir John Walter Huddleston. Appeared in W. P. Frith's famous painting of the marriage of the Prince of Wales in 1863 and also in his 1881 work A Private View at the Royal Academy.
 Lady Charlotte Beauclerk (b. 1849)

He died on 27 May 1849. There is a memorial to him in Highgate Cemetery (west side) with an inscription which reads: To the memory of William Aubrey De Vere, 9th Duke of St Albans, for many years proprietor of Holly Lodge, Highgate, Born March 24th 1801, Died May 26th 1849.

After his death, his widow remarried, as his second wife, Lucius Cary, 10th Viscount of Falkland (formerly the Governor of Nova Scotia and Bombay, on 10 November 1859. They were married until his death in 1884. The Viscountess Falkland died on 2 December 1893 at St Leonards-on-Sea.

Descendants
Through his son, he was a grandfather of Osborne Beauclerk, 12th Duke of St Albans, Lady Moyra Beauclerk (wife of Lord Richard Cavendish, grandson of William Cavendish, 7th Duke of Devonshire), Lady Katherine Beauclerk (wife of Henry Somerset, a grandson of Henry Somerset, 8th Duke of Beaufort and secondly, Maj.-Gen. Sir William Lambton, son of George Lambton, 2nd Earl of Durham), Lady Alexandra Beauclerk, and Lord William Beauclerk, who both died unmarried.

References

External links
William Aubrey de Vere Beauclerk, 9th Duke of St Albans (1801-1849) at the National Portrait Gallery, London

1801 births
1849 deaths
109
W
English cricketers
Hampshire cricketers
English cricketers of 1787 to 1825
Marylebone Cricket Club cricketers